Rupert Lamlang Nongrum (born 21 August 1996) is an Indian professional footballer who plays as a winger for Real Kashmir in the I-League.

Career

Shillong Lajong
Born in Malki Meghalaya, Nongrum joined Shillong Lajong as a youth player in 2010. While with Lajong, Nongrum participated in the Subroto Cup with his high school team, Myngken Christian HSS. He eventually made it up to the under-19 team where he played for the club in the I-League U19. After good performances with the under-19 side, Nongrum was promoted to the reserve side for Shillong Lajong that participated and won the Shillong Premier League. He scored a brace for Lajong in the game that clinched the title for his club against Langsning on 29 November 2014.

His performance for the club in the Shillong Premier League earned Nongrum a promotion to the first-team. He made his senior debut for the club on 14 February 2015 in the I-League against Bengaluru FC. He started the match but could not prevent Shillong Lajong losing 2–0. On 21 January 2017, Rupert scored his first goal for Shillong Lajong against Minerva Punjab FC and won the match 2-1.

Delhi Dynamos (loan)
on 29 July 2016, ISL club Delhi Dynamos announced the signing of Rupert Nongrum on loan from Shillong Lajong. Rupert played as winger under head coach Gianluca Zambrotta in Delhi Dynamos entire season.

ATK
On 23 July 2017, Nongrum has been picked up by Kolkata club ATK.

International
Nongrum was called up to the India U19 side in 2013. He was in the India U19 for the 2014 AFC U-19 Championship Qualifiers and made his debut for India U19 against Uzbekistan by coming-on as 46th-minute substitute for Gurba Gagrai.

Career statistics

References

External links 
 Shillong Lajong Football Club Profile

1996 births
Living people
Indian footballers
Shillong Lajong FC players
Odisha FC players
Association football midfielders
Footballers from Meghalaya
I-League players
Indian Super League players
ATK (football club) players
NorthEast United FC players
RoundGlass Punjab FC players
India youth international footballers